
Halobaculum (common abbreviation: Hbl.) is a genus of the Halorubraceae.

Further reading

Scientific journals

Scientific books

Scientific databases

References

External links

Archaea genera
Taxa described in 1995